Selma Lena Bacha (born 9 November 2000) is a French professional footballer who plays as a left-back or left winger for Division 1 Féminine club Lyon and the France national team.

Early life
Bacha grew up in the Grange Blanche district of Lyon, France. She was introduced to football by her brother at the age of four. She joined the Lyon academy at the age of eight. She is of Algerian and Tunisian descent.

Club career
She continued to progress through the youth ranks at Lyon. In 2013, her performances caught the attention of Sonia Bompastor, a former footballer who was also responsible for Lyon's training centre. She signed a professional contract with Lyon during the 2017–18 season. That same season, Lyon went on to win the Champions League, with Bacha starting in the final. Lyon were to contest the 2019 Champions League final too; Bacha featured in the game as a substitute for Eugénie Le Sommer, coming on in the 82nd minute of the match.

Career statistics

Club

International

Scores and results list France's goal tally first, score column indicates score after each Bacha goal.

Honours
Lyon
 UEFA Women's Champions League: 2017–18, 2018–19, 2019–20, 2021–22
 Division 1 Féminine: 2017–18, 2018–19, 2019–20, 2021–22
 Coupe de France Féminine: 2018–19, 2019–20
 Trophée des Championnes: 2019, 2022

France U19
 UEFA Women's Under-19 Championship: 2019

Individual
IFFHS Women's World Team: 2022

References

External links
 Selma Bacha at Olympique Lyonnais
 
 
 

2000 births
Living people
Women's association football defenders
French women's footballers
France women's youth international footballers
France women's international footballers
French sportspeople of Algerian descent
French sportspeople of Tunisian descent
Division 1 Féminine players
Women's association football fullbacks
Olympique Lyonnais Féminin players
UEFA Women's Euro 2022 players
21st-century French women
Footballers from Lyon